Broke & Famous is the debut album released by the reggaeton duo Ñejo & Dalmata. It was released on December 11, 2007. It has 21 tracks, 4 featuring guest stars like Tego Calderón, Voltio, Arcangel, Los Rabanes, LT, and Chyno Nyno.

Track listing

Chart performance

References

External links

2007 debut albums
Reggaeton albums
Albums produced by Nely